St Mary's Church is in Church Road, Woolton, Liverpool, Merseyside, England. It is an active Roman Catholic parish church in the Liverpool South Deanery of the Archdiocese of Liverpool.  The church is recorded in the National Heritage List for England as a designated Grade II listed building.

History

The church was built in 1859–60, and designed by R. W. Hughes, an architect from Preston.  It was opened on 28 October 1860.  The church was re-decorated in 1981–82, and the font was moved to the front of the church.  The  church's foundation stone was laid 11 September 1859. The Church was known as Saint Benet's until 1881 when it became known as Saint Mary's.

The Catholic Mission in Woolton
A Catholic community has been present for over 300 years. It has had a very varied and interesting history. Notable dates include:

Priests who have served at Saint Mary's 
1862–1873: J.P. O’Brien OSB
1873–1880: P. Whittle OSB
1880–1891: W. Bede Prest OSB
1891–1894: H.G. Murphies OSB
1895–1896: J.W. Richards OSB
1896–1897: C.J. Fitzgerald OSB
1897–1909: Ambrose A. Pereria OSB
1909: A.F. Fleming OSB
1909–1913: Vincent Corney OSB
1913–1919: H.M. Campbell OSB
1919–1928: J.M. Kelly OSB
1928: E.D. Fennell OSB

Assistant priests during the above years  
B.M. Sutter OSB, A.J. McEvoy OSB, T.L. Almond OSB, Vincent Corney OSB, H.W. McKay OSB, P. O’Callaghan OSB, J.R. Riley OSB, J.G. Dolan OSB, C de Neubourg OSB, J.R. Rylance OSB, L.S. Cave OSB, E.D. Fennell OSB, R.V. Gilbertson OSB, J.M. Kelly OSB, F.A. Harrington OSB, T.P. Worsley-Warwick OSB

In 1928 the Benedictines then departed after two centuries of service; Mill Hill Fathers become Rectors
1928–1930: Fr. Herman Drontman
1930–1931: Fr. Martin Onsten
Assistant: Fr. William Ross

The first secular priest Fr. Charles Gelderd was appointed by Archbishop Richard Downey in 1931. 

As Fr. Pat O’Brien's retirement approached, the Congregation of the Most Holy Redeemer better known as the Redemptorists were asked by Archbishop Patrick Kelly to take over the Pastoral Care of St. Mary's. This would be in addition to their parish of Our Lady of the Annunciation of Bishop Eton. The Parishes would not be merged but would continue to exist in their own right.

Architecture

Exterior
St Mary's is constructed in red sandstone and has a slate roof.  It is orientated with the ritual east facing the northwest. The plan consists of a five-bay nave with a north porch but without aisles, large north and south transepts, a chancel with north and south chapels and sacristies.  There is no tower.  At the west end are diagonal buttresses, an entrance, and pointed windows containing Geometric tracery.  The windows along the sides of the nave have two lights.  In the south transept is a four-light window, and the north transept contains two two-light windows with a rose window above.  In the chapel is a five-light window flanked by diagonal buttresses.  The chapels are gabled with two-light windows.  The south sacristy has one and two lights, with a rose window in the gable.

Interior
Inside the church, the high altar and reredos date from 1865, and were probably designed by E. W. Pugin.  They were separated in 1948–50 by Weightman and Bullen, who placed the reredos against the east wall.  The stained glass in the east window dates from 1878, and is a typical design by the Belgian stained glass painter Jean-Baptiste Capronnier.  The two-manual pipe organ was built by Franklin Lloyd in 1895, and is situated in a gallery on the north wall of the church at the west end.

Associated buildings

Presbytery
The presbytery was built in 1864, and designed by E. W. Pugin.  It is constructed in stone, and has a slate roof.  The presbytery has two storeys and a front of three bays, the outer bays projecting under gables.  In the centre bay is a gablet, and the third bay contains a single-storey canted bay window.  The presbytery is connected on the left by a single-storey corridor with a central gabled entrance and a ridge dormer.  It is designated as a Grade II listed building.

Parish Centre (Formally Much Woolton Catholic Primary School)
The school was built in 1869, with its entrance in Mount Street.  It is constructed in red sandstone with a slate roof.  The school is in two storeys and has a nine-bay front, the central bay projecting forward under a gable.  The windows in the ground floor have three lights under ogee heads; those in the upper floor have two lights under cusped heads.  In the gable of the projecting wing is a rose window.  The school is also listed at Grade II. The school building is now used at the Parish Hall and the ground floor is a Nursery.

See also

Grade II listed buildings in Liverpool-L25

References and notes
Notes

Citations

Saint Mary
Grade II listed churches in Merseyside
Roman Catholic churches in Liverpool
Gothic Revival church buildings in England
Gothic Revival architecture in Merseyside
Roman Catholic churches completed in 1860
19th-century Roman Catholic church buildings in the United Kingdom
Redemptorist churches in the United Kingdom